This article contains information about the literary events and publications of 1562.

Events
January 18 – First performance of Thomas Norton and Thomas Sackville's play Gorboduc before Queen Elizabeth I of England. It is the first known English tragedy and the first English-language play to employ blank verse.
July 12 – Fray Diego de Landa, acting Bishop of Yucatán, burns the Maya codices (sacred books of the Maya) during the Spanish conquest of Yucatán.

New books

Prose
Magdeburger Centurien (Magdeburg Centuries), volumes V and VI
Melchior Cano – De Locis theologicis (posthumously published)
Petrus Ramus – Grammaire française
Richard Smyth – De Missa Sacrificio

Drama
Thomas Norton and Thomas Sackville – Gorboduc
Jacke Jugeler

Poetry
Arthur Brooke – The Tragical History of Romeus and Juliet

Births
January 20 – Ottavio Rinuccini, Italian poet (died 1621)
January 31 (bapt.) – Edward Blount, English publisher (died 1632)
March – Francis Johnson, English Separatist theologian and polemicist (died 1618)
March 27 – Jacob Gretser, German Jesuit writer (died 1625)
August – Bartolomé Leonardo de Argensola, Spanish poet and historian (died 1631)
November 25 – Lope de Vega, Spanish poet and dramatist (died 1635)
Unknown dates
Samuel Daniel, English poet (died 1619)
Johann Mechtel, German chronicler (died c. 1631)

Deaths
July 23 – Götz von Berlichingen, German knight immortalized by Goethe (born c. 1480)
September 5 – Katharina Zell, Protestant writer (born c. 1497)
November 6 – Achille Bocchi, Italian humanist writer (born 1488)
November 12 – Pietro Martire Vermigli, Italian theologian (born 1499)
Probable year – George Cavendish, English biographer (born 1494)

References

Years of the 16th century in literature